Janta v/s Janardan – Bechara Aam Aadmi is an upcoming Bollywood film based on political satire, produced by Dhananjay Kumar Yadav under the banner of Dhananjay Films.

Plot
Janta v/s Janardan – Bechara Aam Aadmi is a satirical social comedy film which concentrates on characters who become victims of the corrupt government system. The story revolves around the present day political situation of society and the country. It depicts a society that is divided into two groups: Gainers and Losers, i.e., the politicians and the common people respectively. The film highlights how the common people (Janta) are considered God (Janardan) in a democracy only before the elections. A twist occurs after the elections, when those who vote remain the Janta but those who are elected becomes the Janardan.

The movie depicts the story of a small kasbah, where the government claims to understand the developmental needs of the common people, so that they can become prosperous. However, in reality, the government does not care for their welfare. It regards them simply as ultimate losers. The story gathers momentum as slowly the common people start protesting against the prevailing system to ensure a secure future for themselves. They encourage others to stand against the corrupt political structure for the betterment of their lifestyle. They create awareness that the common people can do anything if they want to because they are not weak and powerless, harking back to Abraham Lincoln's quote "government is of the people, by the people, for the people".

Cast
 Gracy Singh
 Rajpal Yadav
 Govind Namdev
 Sanjai Mishra
 Akhilendra Mishra
 Vineet Kumar
 Pankaj Tripathi
 Ravi Kishan
 Brinda Parekh

Production

Making
On 7 May 2013, the making of the film or 'Mahurat' was officially announced at the Chandivali Studio in Mumbai. The entire cast and crew was present during the Mahurat. A small auspicious Puja followed the announcement. It will be produced by Dhananjay Kumar Yadav under the banner of his production house Dhananjay Films Pvt. Ltd.

Soundtrack

Aadesh Shrivastava composed the music of Janta v/s Janardan – Bechara Aam Aadmi. Singers Bappi Lahiri, Kailash Kher, Shaan, Sonu Nigam and Shreya Ghoshal were spotted recording songs for the film with music director Aadesh Shrivastava, lending their voices for the male and female part of the same song. Aadesh Shrivastava said, "This song, a jitterbug track will be a hit in the clubs. Sonu Nigam has done a fabulous job, like he always does." A song named "Aam Aadmi Jaagega, Ghor Andhera Bhaagega" was shot during the Mahurat. The entire cast was featured in this song.

See also
 Sarkar
 Raajneeti

References

Indian political films
Films scored by Aadesh Shrivastava
2013 films